Peter Douglas Koon Ho-ming,  (born 1966) is the provincial secretary general of Hong Kong Sheng Kung Hui (HKSKH) and a chaplain of HKSKH St John's Cathedral. He is also a member of the Election Committee and 13th Beijing Municipal Committee of the Chinese People’s Political Consultative Conference (CPPCC).

Priesthood 
Koon has been provincial secretary general of the Hong Kong Sheng Kung Hui (HKSKH) since 2007 and is the chairman of the council of the SKH St Christopher's Home and the honorary secretary of the executive committee of HKSKH Welfare Council. He is also the head of the Anglican (Hong Kong) Early Childhood Education Council and the supervisor and manager several of Anglican schools in Hong Kong including St. Stephen's Girls' College where he is the chairman. Koon followed a relatively mild view toward LGBT community in accordance to his Communion, objecting to discrimination occurring in conservative schools and emphatically assured the LGBT community that Anglican schools would be accepting of LGBT faculty and students in 2015.

Political career 
Koon joined former Chief Executive Tung Chee-hwa's Our Hong Kong Foundation, which was filled with senior pro-Beijing politicians, as an adviser in 2014. In 2017, he was appointed by the government to sit on the Committee on the Promotion of Civic Education and the Curriculum Development Council.  In 2018, he was elected to the 13th Beijing Municipal Committee of the Chinese People’s Political Consultative Conference (CPPCC).

In the murder case of Poon Hiu-wing which led the Carrie Lam government to introduce the amendment to the existing extradition law that triggered the widespread anti-extradition protests in 2019, Koon became a spokesman for murder suspect Chan Tong-kai and has provided support to Chan after he was released from prison on money laundering charges relating to the murder case on 23 October 2019. Koon said he had persuaded Chan to surrender himself to Taiwan but Chan failed to turn himself in due to the diplomatic complications between China and Taiwan, even after a year of his release.

After the drastic overhaul of the Hong Kong electoral system imposed by Beijing in 2021, Koon was elected uncontestedly as one of the 1,500 members of Election Committee which was responsible for electing the Chief Executive and 40 of the 90 members in the Legislative Council in the September Election Committee subsector election. In the December 2021 Legislative Council election, Koon decided to run in the Election Committee constituency which was elected by not more than 1,500 members of the Election Committee which he was a member himself.

Honours
 Order of the Hospital of St John of Jerusalem (OStJ) (2016)
 Bronze Bauhinia Star (BBS) (2017)

References

Living people
1966 births
Hong Kong Sheng Kung Hui clergy
Hong Kong educators
HK LegCo Members 2022–2025
Members of the Election Committee of Hong Kong, 2021–2026
Recipients of the Bronze Bauhinia Star